The New Zealand national cricket team toured Australia in the 1989-90 season and played one Test match against Australia.

The New Zealanders had a brief tour of Australia playing two first class matches and a Test at Perth. The match ended in a draw.

Test series summary

External sources
CricketArchive

References
 Playfair Cricket Annual
 Wisden Cricketers Almanack 

1989 in Australian cricket
1989 in New Zealand cricket
1989–90 Australian cricket season
1990 in Australian cricket
1990 in New Zealand cricket
International cricket competitions from 1988–89 to 1991
1989-90